Jacques Bigot may refer to:

 Jacques Bigot (Jesuit) (1651–1711), Jesuit priest
 Jacques Bigot (politician) (born 1952), French politician
 Jacques-Marie-Frangile Bigot (1818–1893), French entomologist